The New Zealand women's national cricket team toured Australia in January and February 2012. They played against Australia in five Twenty20 Internationals and three One Day Internationals, as part of the Rose Bowl. Australia won both series: the T20Is 4–1 and the ODIs 1–0.

Squads

WT20I Series

1st T20I

2nd T20I

3rd T20I

4th T20I

5th T20I

WODI Series

1st ODI

2nd ODI

3rd ODI

References

External links
New Zealand Women tour of Australia 2011/12 from Cricinfo

Women's international cricket tours of Australia
2012 in Australian cricket
New Zealand women's national cricket team tours